Engstler Motorsport is a private German auto racing team based in Wiggensbach, run by driver Franz Engstler. It has competed successfully in the Asian Touring Car Championship and the ADAC Procar Series. It is sponsored by lubricants company Liqui Moly and known officially as Liqui Moly Team Engstler.

World Touring Car Championship

BMW 320i (2005, 2007)
The team made its World Touring Car Championship debut in the end of season 2005 Guia Race of Macau, with two BMW 320is for Hong Kong driver Paul Poon and New Zealander Peter Scharmach. While Poon failed to qualify for the race, Scharmach finished 16th in the first race, but retired in the second.

The team returned to the WTCC at Macau two years later, running three 320is for Franz Engstler, Andrei Romanov and David Louie. They finished 19th, 24th and 25th respectively in the first race, while in the second race Engstler came home 16th, while Romanov and Louie retired. Having only competed in the final event the team still managed to finish seventh in the independent team's trophy.

BMW 320si (2008–2010)
Engstler and Romanov competed full-time in 2008 in BMW 320sis, with Engstler scoring three points in the Overall Championship, finishing second in the Independent's Trophy, with Romanov finishing fifth. Japan's Masaki Kano competed in an older 320i model in the final two rounds of the series. The team finished second in the independent team's standings behind fellow BMW team Proteam Motorsport.

Dane Kristian Poulsen was brought in to race alongside Franz Engstler in 2009.  Engstler was leading at the end of the first lap of the second race at the Race of France when he and the safety car collided, taking him out of the race. For the Race of UK and Race of Germany, the team ran a third car for ADAC Procar Series champion Philip Geipel. Macanese driver Henry Ho made his series debut with the team at the Race of Japan while Kano returned for the race. The team ran five cars at the Race of Macau, Engstler, Poulsen and Ho were joined by series debutants Alex Liu and Jo Merszei.

Engstler was paired with Romanov for the full 2010 World Touring Car Championship season. Romanov was unable to attend the Race of UK and was replaced by SEAT León Eurocup driver Tim Coronel. The team ran an additional car at the Race of Japan for Yoshihiro Ito, they then ran two extra cars alongside Engstler and Romanov at the Race of Macau for Kano and Merszei.

BMW 320 TC and BMW 320si (2011–present)
The team ran the new BMW 320 TC chassis for the 2011 season with team owner Franz Engstler being paired with Kristian Poulsen who returned to the team after a year driving for his own team. Poulsen took the team's first podium finish in race two of the Race of Italy went he finished third behind Robert Huff and Yvan Muller. Engstler then took his and the team's first WTCC victory in race two of their home race. Formula D driver Charles Ng joined the team for the Race of Japan where he drove an older BMW 320si. Fabio Fabiani took over the third car for the Race of China having moved across from Proteam Racing while Charles Ng moving to DeTeam KK Motorsport. Fabiani wrapped up the Jay–Ten Trophy for drivers in natural aspirated cars in China while the team secured the independent team's trophy title. Fabiani was replaced for the Race of Macau by local driver Jo Merszei. Poulsen secured the Yokohama Independent Drivers' Trophy title.

Team Engstler entered the 2012 World Touring Car Championship season with team owner Engstler as their first driver. Charles Ng was later confirmed in their second car for the full season having joined to the team for the Race of Japan the previous season. Masaki Kano joined the team for the Race of Japan, driving a naturally aspirated BMW 320si. Alex Liu then took over the car for the Race of China. At the season finale in Macau, Merszei raced the team's third car.

The team returned to the WTCC for the 2013 season, retaining their lineup of Engstler and Ng.

Results

World Touring Car Championship

World Touring Car Cup

ADAC Formula 4

References

External links
 

German auto racing teams
World Touring Car Championship teams
Deutsche Tourenwagen Masters teams
ADAC GT Masters teams
TCR International Series teams
TCR Asia Series teams
Honda in motorsport